Evert Geradts (born 9 June 1943, The Hague) is a Dutch cartoonist and former underground comics artist. He later became a prolific Disney comics writer and artist too. He is the winner with Leny Zwalve of the 1977 Stripschapprijs.

References

1943 births
Living people
Dutch cartoonists
Dutch comics artists
Dutch comics writers
Disney comics artists
Disney comics writers
Underground cartoonists
Artists from The Hague
Winners of the Stripschapsprijs